Barbara the Fair with the Silken Hair  is a 1969 Soviet fantasy film directed by Alexander Rou and based on the fairy tale  by Vasily Zhukovsky.

The film premiered December 30, 1970.

Plot 
Once upon a time there was a king Yeremei. He went to the annual campaign to make an inventory of his kingdom-state. He leaned over once to the well to drink, but immediately grabbed by the underwater tsar Chudo - Yudo. Demanded a ransom for the release - such as Jeremiah did not know or wondered what it is in his kingdom. The king agreed, not knowing that in the absence of the queen gave birth to a son.

Cast
 Mikhail Pugovkin as tsar Yeremei (the king)
 Georgy Millyar as  Chudo-Yudo (slavic monster, the underwater king)
 Anatoly Kubatsky as Afonya, dyak  
 Aleksei Katyshev as Andrey, son of a fisherman 
 Sergei Nikolaev as Andrey, the tsar's son
 Tatiana Klyueva as Varvara-beauty, daughter of Chudo-Yudo
 Varvara Popova as Stepanida, nanny
 Most real pirates:
 Alexander Khvylya as Duc de la Bull
Lev Potyomkin as Marquis de la Kis
Arkady Zinman as Baron de la Pig
Isaac Leongarov as Viscount de la Dog
 Boris Sichkin as Groom-prestidigitator
 Valentina Ananina as fisherwoman
 Vera Altayskaya as starushka-veselushka (old lady jester)
 Anastasia Zuyeva as narrator

Interesting facts 
 The shooting took place on the banks of the Moscow River, near the Pioneer Camp Mirny, the name of Sergei Kirov (at Moscow Institute of Thermal), located near the village of Anikovo village of Odintsovsky District, Moscow Oblast.

References

External links
  
  «Варвара-краса, длинная коса» (рецензия)

1969 films
Films directed by Aleksandr Rou
Pirate films
Gorky Film Studio films
Soviet fantasy films
Films based on Slavic mythology
Films based on Russian folklore
1960s fantasy films
1970s Russian-language films
Russian fairy tales
Films based on fairy tales